Clara is an unincorporated community in central Texas County, Missouri, United States. The community is located on a hilltop, approximately one-half mile northwest of the Big Piney River. It is about three miles southwest of Houston on Missouri Route Z.

A post office called Clara was established in 1901, and remained in operation until 1975. An early postmaster gave the community the name of his wife, Clara Lynch.

References

Unincorporated communities in Texas County, Missouri
Populated places established in 1902
Unincorporated communities in Missouri